Play in Group A of the 1990 FIFA World Cup completed on 19 June 1990. Italy won the group and advanced to the second round, along with Czechoslovakia. Austria and the United States failed to advance.

Standings

Matches
All times are local (UTC+1)

Italy vs Austria

United States vs Czechoslovakia

Italy vs United States

Austria vs Czechoslovakia

Italy vs Czechoslovakia

Austria vs United States

Group A
Group
Group
Group
Group